Gilbert John Mellé (31 December 1931 – 28 October 2004) was an American artist, jazz musician and film composer.

Life and career 
In the 1950s, Mellé created the cover art for albums by Miles Davis, Thelonious Monk and Sonny Rollins. Mellé led a number of sessions recorded for the Blue Note and Prestige labels between 1952 and 1957. He also appeared at the first Newport Jazz Festival, leading a band that also contained Joe Cinderella, Vinnie Burke, and Ed Thigpen.

As a film and TV composer, Mellé was one of the first to use self-built electronic instruments, either alone or as an added voice among the string, wind, brass, and percussion sections of the orchestra. Mellé died in Malibu, California on October 28, 2004.

Discography

As composer and arranger
Gil Mellé Quintet/Sextet (Blue Note, 1953)
Gil Mellé Quintet with Urbie Green and Tal Farlow (Blue Note, 1953)
Gil Mellé Quartet featuring Lou Mecca (Blue Note, 1954)
5 Impressions of Color (Blue Note, 1955)
Patterns in Jazz (Blue Note, 1956)
Primitive Modern (Prestige, 1956)
Gil's Guests (Prestige, 1956)
Quadrama (Prestige, 1957)
Tome VI (Verve, 1967)
Waterbirds (Nocturne, 1970)
The Andromeda Strain (Kapp, 1971)
Mindscapes (Blue Note, 1991)
  The Organization (Intrada, 2010). World premiere release of the original soundtrack of the 1971 film. Produced by Douglass Fake. Liner notes by James Phillips. Art Direction by Joe Sikoyak.
  Borderline (Intrada, 2012). World premiere release of the original score to the 1980 film. Produced by Douglass Fake. Liner Notes by James Phillips. Art Direction by Joe Sikoyak.

Film scores 

 The Andromeda Strain (1971)
 The Organization (1971)
 The Manipulator (1971)
 You'll Like My Mother (1972)
 Bone (1972)
 The Ultimate Warrior (1975)
 Embryo (1976)
 Starship Invasions (1977)
 The Sentinel (1977)
 Blood Beach (1980)
 Borderline (1980)
 The Last Chase (1981)
 Hot Target (1985)

Television scores

Television series 

 Ironside (1968) - 1 episode
 Then Came Bronson (1969–70) - 2 episodes
 Night Gallery (1969–73) - Theme music
 The Psychiatrist (1970–71) - Theme music
 Columbo (1971–72) - 4 episodes
 Tenafly (1973) - 4 episodes
 Kolchak: The Night Stalker (1974–75) - Theme music
 World War III (1982) - Miniseries
 Fatal Vision (1984) - Miniseries
 Veronica Clare (1991) - 9 episodes

Television films 

 Lieutenant Schuster's Wife (1972)
 That Certain Summer (1972)
 The Victim (1972)
 The Judge and Jake Wyler (1972)
 The Astronaut (1972)
 A Cold Night's Death (1973)
 The Six Million Dollar Man (1973)
 Partners in Crime (1973)
 Savage (1973)
 The President's Plane Is Missing (1973)
 Trapped (1973)
 The Six Million Dollar Man: The Solid Gold Kidnapping (1973)
 Frankenstein: The True Story (1973)
 Legend in Granite (1973)
 The Questor Tapes (1974)
 Killdozer! (1974)
 Hitchhike (1974)
 The Last Angry Man (1974)
 The Savage Is Loose (1974)
 The Missing Are Deadly (1975)
 A Cry for Help (1975)
 The Imposter (1975)
 Crime Club (1975)
 Death Scream (1975)
 The Art of Crime (1975)
 Dynasty (1976)
 Perilous Voyage (1976)
 Gold of the Amazon Women (1979)
 A Vacation in Hell (1979)
 Attica (1980)
 The Curse of King Tut's Tomb (1980)
 Rape and Marriage: The Rideout Case (1980)
 The Intruder Within (1981)
 Through Naked Eyes (1983)
 Jealousy (1984)
 Best Kept Secrets (1984)
 Flight 90: Disaster on the Potomac (1984)
 Sweet Revenge (1984)
 Starcrossed (1985)
 When Dreams Come True (1985)
 Killer in the Mirror (1986)
 The Deliberate Stranger (1986)
 Circle of Violence: A Family Drama (1986)
 Stillwatch (1987)
 The Taking of Flight 847: The Uli Derickson Story (1988)
 From the Dead of Night (1989)
 The Case Of The Hillside Stranglers (1989)
 So Proudly We Hail (1990)
 Good Cops, Bad Cops (1990)
 Fire: Trapped on the 37th Floor (1991)
 Night Owl (1993)

Awards and nominations 
 1972 Golden Globe Award for Best Original Score: The Andromeda Strain (nominated)

References

External links 
 
 Obituary - All About Jazz
 

 

1931 births
2004 deaths
American film score composers
American jazz composers
American male jazz composers
American jazz saxophonists
American male saxophonists
Blue Note Records artists
20th-century American sculptors
20th-century American male artists
American male sculptors
20th-century American saxophonists
20th-century American composers
American male film score composers
20th-century American male musicians
20th-century jazz composers